This is a list of Belgian First Division seasons.

Championship Cup 1895-96
Championship Cup 1896-97
Championship Cup 1897-98
Championship Cup 1898-99
Championship Cup 1899-1900
Championship Cup 1900-01
Championship Cup 1901-02
Championship Cup 1902-03
Championship Cup 1903-04
Belgian First Division 1904-05
Belgian First Division 1905-06
Belgian First Division 1906-07
Belgian First Division 1907-08
Belgian First Division 1908-09
Belgian First Division 1909-10
Belgian First Division 1910-11
Belgian First Division 1911-12
Belgian First Division 1912-13
Belgian First Division 1913-14
Belgian First Division 1919-20
Belgian First Division 1920-21
Belgian First Division 1921-22
Belgian First Division 1922-23
Belgian First Division 1923-24
Belgian First Division 1924-25
Belgian First Division 1925-26
Belgian Premier Division 1926-27
Belgian Premier Division 1927-28
Belgian Premier Division 1928-29
Belgian Premier Division 1929-30
Belgian Premier Division 1930-31
Belgian Premier Division 1931-32
Belgian Premier Division 1932-33
Belgian Premier Division 1933-34
Belgian Premier Division 1934-35
Belgian Premier Division 1935-36
Belgian Premier Division 1936-37
Belgian Premier Division 1937-38
Belgian Premier Division 1938-39
Belgian Premier Division 1941-42
Belgian Premier Division 1942-43
Belgian Premier Division 1943-44
Belgian Premier Division 1945-46
Belgian Premier Division 1946-47
Belgian Premier Division 1947-48
Belgian Premier Division 1948-49
Belgian Premier Division 1949-50
Belgian Premier Division 1950-51
Belgian Premier Division 1951-52
Belgian First Division 1952-53
Belgian First Division 1953-54
Belgian First Division 1954-55
Belgian First Division 1955-56
Belgian First Division 1956-57
Belgian First Division 1957-58
Belgian First Division 1958-59
Belgian First Division 1959-60
Belgian First Division 1960-61
Belgian First Division 1961-62
Belgian First Division 1962-63
Belgian First Division 1963-64
Belgian First Division 1964-65
Belgian First Division 1965-66
Belgian First Division 1966-67
Belgian First Division 1967-68
Belgian First Division 1968-69
Belgian First Division 1969-70
Belgian First Division 1970-71
Belgian First Division 1971-72
Belgian First Division 1972-73
Belgian First Division 1973-74
Belgian First Division 1974-75
Belgian First Division 1975-76
Belgian First Division 1976-77
Belgian First Division 1977-78
Belgian First Division 1978-79
Belgian First Division 1979-80
Belgian First Division 1980-81
Belgian First Division 1981-82
Belgian First Division 1982-83
Belgian First Division 1983-84
Belgian First Division 1984-85
Belgian First Division 1985-86
Belgian First Division 1986-87
Belgian First Division 1987-88
Belgian First Division 1988-89
Belgian First Division 1989-90
Belgian First Division 1990-91
Belgian First Division 1991-92
Belgian First Division 1992-93
Belgian First Division 1993-94
Belgian First Division 1994-95
Belgian First Division 1995-96
Belgian First Division 1996-97
Belgian First Division 1997-98
Belgian First Division 1998-99
Belgian First Division 1999-2000
Belgian First Division 2000-01
Belgian First Division 2001-02
Belgian First Division 2002-03
Belgian First Division 2003-04
Belgian First Division 2004-05
Belgian First Division 2005-06
Belgian First Division 2006-07
Belgian First Division 2007-08
Belgian First Division 2008-09
Belgian First Division 2009-10
Belgian First Division 2010-11
Belgian Pro League 2011-12
Belgian Pro League 2012-13
Belgian Pro League 2013-14
Belgian Pro League 2014-15
Belgian Pro League 2015-16
Belgian First Division A 2016-17

Association football in Belgium lists